The 1968–69 Serie A season was the 35th season of the Serie A, the top level of ice hockey in Italy. Four teams participated in the league, and HC Gherdeina won the championship.

Regular season

External links
 Season on hockeytime.net

1968–69 in Italian ice hockey
Serie A (ice hockey) seasons
Italy